Oliver Wendell Holmes may refer to:

People
 Oliver Wendell Holmes Sr. (1809–1894), poet, physician, and essayist, father of the judge
 Oliver Wendell Holmes Jr. (1841–1935), an associate justice of the Supreme Court of the United States, son of the essayist
 Oliver Wendell Holmes (archivist) (1902–1981), American archivist and historian
 Wendell Holmes (actor) (1914–1962), character actor Oliver Wendell Holmes

Schools
 Oliver Wendell Holmes Junior High School, Davis, California, named after Oliver Wendell Holmes Sr.
 Oliver Wendell Holmes High School, San Antonio, Texas named after Oliver Wendell Holmes Jr.

See also 
 Oliver Wendell Holmes House, Oliver Wendell Holmes Jr.'s house
 Oliver Holmes (disambiguation)

Holmes, Oliver Wendell